The 2010–11 VHL season was the inaugural season of the Higher Hockey League. It started on September 11, 2010, and finished on February 28, 2011. 20 teams each played 56 games.

Preseason
Compared to the last 2009–10 Higher Hockey League where a total of 27 teams competed in 3 divisions, there will be a total of 20 teams and two conferences in the 2010–11 season: Western and Eastern. 18 of the 27 teams of the 2009–10 season compete in the 2010–11 season. Gazovik Tyumen were renamed to Rubin Tyumen, while Rubin's junior team, playing in the MHL, has the name Gazovik. Two new teams in the league are Lada Togliatti, excluded from the KHL after the 2009–10 season, and Dynamo Tver, the farm team of UHC Dynamo. The fates of the 9 of the 27 teams that participated in the league in 2009–10 but no longer do in 2010–11 are various: HC Yugra joined the KHL for 2010–11, Khimik were suggested by VHL's management to take a one year break and joined the MHL under the name MHC Khimik, the team from Orenburg, formerly known under the name Gazprom-OGU, also joined the MHL under the name Belye Tigry, Rys dissolved, the remaining 5 (e.g. CSK VVS Samara) joined the Pervaya Liga. HC Lipetsk was admitted into the league for 2010–11, but the team had to withdraw before the start of the season due to financial difficulties. Lipetsk's place was taken by Krylya Sovetov Moscow on 12 August 2010.

Regular season
During regular season teams are to play 4 games against teams from their conference (2 home and 2 away) and 2 games against teams from the opposite conference (1 home and 1 away). The first match of the regular season  took place on September 11, 2010 in Perm. Molot-Prikamye's opponent was Toros Neftekamsk and the match ended 2 goals to 1 Toros' way after a shootout. Last games of the regular season will be held on 28 February 2011.

League standings

Source: vhl.khl.ru

Points are awarded as follows:
3 Points for a win in regulation ("W")
2 Points for a win in overtime ("OTW") or penalty shootout ("SOW")
1 Point for a loss in a penalty shootout ("SOL") or overtime ("OTL")
0 Points for a loss in regulation ("L")

Conference standings

League leaders

Source: vhlru.ru

Goaltenders: minimum 15 games played

Playoffs
The play-offs will feature 8 best teams of the Western Conference of the regular season and 8 best teams of the Eastern Conference of the regular season. The play-offs start 5 March 2011 and are to end on April 27, 2011 if match 7 of the final series is to be played. Conference quarter-finals and semi-finals are a best-of-five series, while the Conference finals and VHL finals are a best-of-seven series.

Playoffs leaders

Source: vhlru.ru

Goaltenders: minimum 5 games played

References

2
Rus
Russian Major League seasons